Christopher Díaz Vélez (born October 31, 1994) is an American-born Puerto Rican professional boxer who challenged for the WBO junior lightweight title in 2018. At regional level he held the WBO-NABO junior lightweight title from 2017 to 2018.

Professional career
Díaz signed with Top Rank in 2015. On December 26, 2016, Díaz was named Prospect Of The Year by ESPN Deportes.

Diaz vs. Sanchez 
On 23 June 2020, Diaz fought Jason Sanchez. Diaz won via unanimous decision, 98–92, 98–92 and 97–93.

Diaz vs. Navarrete 
In his next bout, Diaz fought Emanuel Navarrete for his WBO featherweight title. Diaz los via TKO in the final, twelfth round.

Diaz vs. Dogboe 
In his next bout, Diaz fought former champion Isaac Dogboe. Dogboe was ranked #3 by the WBO, #9 by the WBC and #10 by the IBF at featherweight at the time. Diaz lost via majority decision, with the scorecards reading 97–93 and 96–94 in favour of Dogboe and the third judge scoring it 95-95.

Professional boxing record

Personal life
Díaz has three daughters.

References

External links

Christopher Díaz profile at Top Rank
Christopher Diaz - Profile, News Archive & Current Rankings at Box.Live

1994 births
Living people
Puerto Rican male boxers
Super-featherweight boxers